, was a politician and cabinet minister in Japan, serving once as a member of the Lower House of the pre-war Diet of Japan, and three times as a member of the post-war House of Councillors. He also held cabinet-level posts three times.

Biography 
Ino was born in Nihonbashi-ku, a former administration division of Tokyo that is now part of Chūō, Tokyo, and was educated at the Kaisei Academy, following which he graduated from Tokyo Imperial University. He was hired as a bureaucrat in the Ministry of Agriculture and Commerce, eventually hiring to become director of the sericulture bureau. With the establishment of the Kikakuin in 1937, Ino became vice-chairman in charge of irrigation.  In June 1941, he joined the cabinet as Minister of Agriculture and Forestry under the 2nd Konoe administration.  He concurrently held the portfolio of Minister of Colonial Affairs, until that post was abolished under the Tōjō administration in 1942.

In the 1942 General Election, Ino was elected to the Lower House as a representative from Mie Prefecture, with the backing of the Taisei Yokusankai  political party. However, Ino was later chairman of the Gokoku Dōshikai, a political group founded in March 1945 with the aim of toppling Tōjō and one-party rule, and opening negotiations for an end to World War II.

After the surrender of Japan, as with all other former government ministers, Ino was purged from public office and arrested by the Supreme Commander of the Allied Powers to stand trial for Class-A war crimes. He shared a cell in Sugamo Prison with Okinori Kaya, but his case never came to trial and he was released on parole.

Following the end of occupation of Japan, Ino ran for public office again in the 1953 General Election with the support of the Liberal Party and was elected to a seat in the House of Councillors of the post-war Diet of Japan, from Mie Prefecture. He was subsequently re-elected twice from the same district under the Liberal-Democratic Party ticket. Ino was a member of the faction led by Nobusuke Kishi. In 1959, after Kishi became Prime Minister of Japan he was to accept the position of Minister of Justice in his second cabinet. In 1965, Ino was awarded the 1st class of the Order of the Sacred Treasures and in 1973 he was awarded the 1st class of the Order of the Rising Sun. Ino published his memoirs in 1978.

Ino died in 1980. His grave is at the Tama Cemetery in Fuchū, Tokyo.

References 

1891 births
1980 deaths
Government ministers of Japan
Kaisei Academy alumni
Liberal Democratic Party (Japan) politicians
Liberal Party (Japan, 1945) politicians
Members of the House of Councillors (Japan)
Members of the House of Representatives (Empire of Japan)
Politicians from Tokyo
Imperial Rule Assistance Association politicians
Recipients of the Order of the Rising Sun
Recipients of the Order of the Sacred Treasure
University of Tokyo alumni